Vitthalrao Gadgil (September 22, 1928–2001) was a leader of Indian National Congress. He served as union minister of information and broadcasting during Rajeev Gandhi era.

Details
He was a member of Lok Sabha elected from Pune. He was member of the Rajya Sabha from 1971 to 1980 and from 1994 to 2000 and of the Lok Sabha from 1980 to 1991. 
He was the chief spokesperson of the Congress under party presidents like Indira Gandhi, Rajiv Gandhi, Narasimha Rao and Sonia Gandhi.  He was a senior advocate of the Supreme Court and honorary professor of economics in Ruparel College, Mumbai and professor of constitutional law in New Law College, Mumbai. He has written four books in Marathi : Trials of Great Man, Judicial Administration in India, Obscenity and the Law and International Law.

Personal life
V N Gadgil's father, Narhar Vishnu Gadgil (also known as Kakasaheb Gadgil), was also a politician from Congress Party, and served in Jawaharlal Nehru's cabinet, and as Governor of Punjab. His son Anant Gadgil is an MLC and a National Media Panelist for the party.

References

Politicians from Pune
2001 deaths
India MPs 1980–1984
India MPs 1984–1989
India MPs 1989–1991
Lok Sabha members from Maharashtra
Rajya Sabha members from Maharashtra
1928 births
Union Ministers from Maharashtra
Marathi politicians
Ministers for Information and Broadcasting of India
Indian National Congress politicians from Maharashtra